Kachin or Kakhyen may refer to:
Kachin State, in northern Myanmar/Burma
 Kachin Hills, northeastern Myanmar
Kachin peoples, a generalised term for six non-Burman ethno-linguistic groups in Kachin State.
Kachin people, including the main sub-branch of the Kachin people, for whom the term Jingpo (used in Yunnan, China) and Kachin (used in Myanmar) are considered interchangeable, and the Singpho people, members of the ethnic group living in Yunnan and Arunachal Pradesh, India.
Jingphaw language, or Kachin language
A 'relaxed' variant of Lethwei martial arts
Kachin (spider), an extinct genus; see List of Uloboridae species

See also 
 Kachin-Luic languages or Jinghpaw languages

Language and nationality disambiguation pages